Markup or mark-up can refer to:

 Markup language, a standardized set of notations used to annotate a plain-text document's content to give information regarding the structure of the text or instructions for how it is to be displayed
 Lightweight markup language, notation that adds basic markup to a client
 Markup rule in economics, a formula for the ratio of a monopolist's chosen price to its marginal cost
 Markup (business) a term in retail business describing the increase in the price of goods to cover expenses and create a profit margin
 Markup (legislation), the process to amend bills
 The Markup, American nonprofit organization publishing data-driven journalism